Jeff Kysar (born June 14, 1972) is a former American football tackle. He played for the Oakland Raiders in 1995.

References

1972 births
Living people
American football offensive tackles
Arizona State Sun Devils football players
Oakland Raiders players